The 3rd Annual Irish Film & Television Awards was hosted by James Nesbitt on 5 November 2005 at the Royal Dublin Society, Dublin, honouring Irish film and television released in 2005.

Awards in film

Best Film
 Pavee Lackeen (Winner)
 Mickybo and Me
 The Mighty Celt
 Tara Road
 Trouble With Sex

Best Short Fiction Award
 Martin McDonagh for Six Shooter (Winner)
 Rory Bresnihan & John Butler for George
 Ronan Burke and Rob Burke for Jellybaby
 Ken Wardrop for Ouch

Best Animation Award Winner
 Cúilín Dualach (Winner)
 Agricultural Report
 Dick Terrapin
 Not There Yet

Best Director
 Terry George for Hotel Rwanda (Winner)
Anthony Byrne for Short Order
Fintan Connolly for Trouble With Sex
Perry Ogden for Pavee Lackeen

Best Cinematography
 Seamus Deasy for The Mighty Celt (Winner)
Brendan Galvin for The Flight of the Phoenix
Seamus McGarvey for Sahara
Owen McPolin for Trouble With Sex

Best Music
 Gregory Magee for Winter's End (Winner)
 Niall Byrne for Short Order
 Niall Byrne for Trouble With Sex
 Fiachra Trench for The Boys & Girl From County Clare

Best Script
 Anthony Byrne for Short Order (Winner)
 Pearse Elliott for The Mighty Celt
 Terry George for Hotel Rwanda
 Terry Loane for Mickybo and Me

Best Production Design
 Eleanor Wood & Laura Bowe for Short Order (Winner)
 Laurent Mellet for Trouble With Sex
 Tom McCullagh for Mickybo and Me
 Anna Rackard for Boy Eats Girl

Best Costume Design
 Hazel Webb-Crozier for Mickybo and Me (Winner)
 Susan Scott for Boy Eats Girl
 Marian Smyth for Trouble With Sex
 Judith Williams for Short Order

Awards across TV and film

Best Documentary in the English Language
 John McGahern: A Private World (Winner)
 Macintyre's Underworld: Gangsters
 Haughey
 My Name Is Paul

Best Documentary in the Irish Language
 Concerto – Do Chaitlín Maude (Winner)
 An Bathadh Mór
 Cosc Ar Ghnéas
 Iran: An Bealach In Airde

Best Editing in Film / TV Drama 
 Emer Reynolds for Shameless (Winner)
 J. Patrick Duffner for Short Order
 Ray Roantree for Trouble With Sex
 Ben Yates for Love Is the Drug

Best Sound in Film / TV Drama Award Winner
 Philippe Faujas, Niall Brady & Ken Galvin for Pure Mule (Winner)
 Patrick Drummond, Tom Johnson, John Fitzgerald & Stuart Bruce for Boy Eats Girl
 Ray Cross, Nikki Moss, John Fitzgerald John Fitzgerald & Peter Blayney for Short Order
 Karl Merre, Nicky Moss & Ken Galvinfod for Showbands

Awards in television

Best TV Drama / Drama Series
 Love Is the Drug (Winner)
 Murphy's Law
 Pure Mule
 Showbands

Best Current Affairs Programme
 Prime Time Investigates: "Home Truths" (Winner)
 Prime Time Investigates: "The Money Pit"
 Insight: "When Hospitals Kill"
 Spotlight: "Dirty Secrets"

Best News Programme
 BBC Newsline (Winner)
 Nuacht TG4
 RTÉ News
 Sky News Ireland

Best Children's / Youth Programme
 PicMe (Winner)
 GFI: Go For It
 The Island of Inis Cool
 What's The Story?

Best Entertainment Award Winner
 Stew (Winner)
 Killinaskully
 The Panel
 Wild Trials

Best Lifestyle Programme
 Show Me The Money (Winner)
 Neelo: "KKK"
 Mother Knows Best
 The Snip

Best Sports Feature
 Marooned  (Winner)
 Coach
 The Crossing
 Final Words: Hurling '04

Best Director TV Drama / Drama Series 
 Declan Recks for Pure Mule (Winner)
 Aisling Walsh for Fingersmith
 Charlie McCarthy for Pure Mule
 Dearbhla Walsh for Shameless

Awards in acting

Best Actor in Leading Role – Film
 Liam Neeson for Kinsey (Winner)
 Gabriel Byrne for Wah-Wah
 Cillian Murphy for Red Eye
 Aidan Quinn for Convicted

Best Actress in a Leading Role – Film
 Renee Weldon for Trouble With Sex (Winner)
 Andrea Corr for The Boys & Girl From County Clare
 Jillian Bradbury for Winter's End
 Winnie Maughan for Pavee Lackeen
 Renee Weldon for Trouble With Sex

Best Actor in a Supporting Role – Film
 David Kelly for Charlie and the Chocolate Factory (Winner)
 Seán McGinley for On a Clear Day
 Cillian Murphy for Batman Begins
 Tagdh Murphy for Boy Eats Girl

Best Actress in a Supporting Role – Film
 Charlotte Bradley for The Boys & Girl From County Clare (Winner)
 Nora Jane Noone for The Descent
 Deirdre O'Kane for Boy Eats Girl
 Tatiana Ouliankina for Short Order

Best Actor – Television
 Tom Murphy for Pure Mule (Winner)
 Allen Leech for Love Is the Drug
 Finbar Lynch for Proof 2
 James Nesbitt for Murphy's Law

Best Actress – Television
 Dawn Bradfield for Pure Mule (Winner)
 Elaine Cassidy for Fingersmith
 Anne Marie Duff for Shameless
 Aisling O'Sullivan for The Clinic

Best Actor in a Supporting Role – Television
 Garrett Lombard for Pure Mule (Winner)
 Gary Lydon for The Clinic
 John Lynch for The Baby War
 Chris O'Dowd for The Clinic

Best Actress in a Supporting Role – Television
 Eileen Walsh for Pure Mule (Winner)
 Eva Birthistle for The Baby War
 Tine Kellegher for Showbands
 Eleanor Methevan for Love Is the Drug

People's Choice Awards

O2 TV Personality of the Year
 Mark Cagney (Winner)
 Aoife Ní Thuairisg
 Stephen Nolan
 Gráinne Seoige
 Pat Shortt

AIB Best Irish Film
 Inside I'm Dancing (Winner)
 Adam & Paul
 Headrush
 Mickybo and Me

Jameson Best International Film 
 Charlie and the Chocolate Factory (Winner)
 Batman Begins
 Crash
 Sin City

Avica Best International Actor
 Mickey Rourke for Sin City (Winner)
 Christian Bale for Batman Begins
 Johnny Depp for Charlie and the Chocolate Factory
 Brad Pitt for Mr. & Mrs. Smith

Pantene Best International Actress
 Gillian Anderson for The Mighty Celt (Winner)
 Drew Barrymore for The Perfect Catch
 Dakota Fanning for War of the Worlds
 Natalie Portman for Garden State

Lifetime achievement award

 Awarded to David Kelly

References

2005 film awards
2005 in Irish television
3